Montenegro is a country in Southeastern Europe. It is a part of the Balkans and is bordered by Bosnia and Herzegovina to the north, Serbia to the northeast, Kosovo to the east, Albania to the southeast, Croatia to the northwest, and the Adriatic Sea to the west with a coastline of 293.5 km. Cetinje is the former royal capital of Montenegro and is the location of several national institutions, including the official residence of the president of Montenegro. 

During the Early Medieval period, three principalities were located on the territory of modern-day Montenegro: Duklja, roughly corresponding to the southern half; Travunia, the west; and Rascia proper, the north. The Principality of Zeta emerged in the 14th and 15th centuries. From the late 14th century to the late 18th century, large parts of southern Montenegro were ruled by the Venetian Republic and incorporated into Venetian Albania. The name Montenegro was first used to refer to the country in the late 15th century. After falling under Ottoman Empire rule, Montenegro gained its semi-autonomy in 1696 under the rule of the House of Petrović-Njegoš, first as a theocracy and later as a secular principality. Montenegro's independence was recognised by the Great Powers at the Congress of Berlin in 1878. In 1910, the country became a kingdom.

After World War I, the kingdom became part of Yugoslavia. Following the breakup of Yugoslavia, the republics of Serbia and Montenegro together proclaimed a federation. Following an independence referendum held in May 2006, Montenegro declared its independence in June 2006 and the confederation dissolved.

Montenegro has an upper-middle-income economy and ranks 48th in the Human Development Index. It is a member of the United Nations, NATO, the World Trade Organization, the Organization for Security and Co-operation in Europe, the Council of Europe, and the Central European Free Trade Agreement. Montenegro is also a founding member of the Union for the Mediterranean, and is currently in the process of joining the European Union.

Etymology 
The country's English name derives from Venetian and translates as "Black Mountain", deriving from the appearance of Mount Lovćen when covered in dense evergreen forests.

The native name Crna Gora, also meaning "black mountain" or "black hill", was mentioned for the first time in a charter issued by Stefan Milutin. It came to denote the majority of contemporary Montenegro in the 15th century. 
Modern-day Montenegro was more and more known by that name in the historical period following the fall of the Serbian Despotate. Originally, it had referred to only a small strip of land under the rule of the Paštrovići tribe, but the name eventually came to be used for the wider mountainous region after the Crnojević noble family took power in Upper Zeta. The aforementioned region became known as Stara Crna Gora 'Old Montenegro' by the 19th century to distinguish the independent region from the neighbouring Ottoman-occupied Montenegrin territory of Brda '(The) Highlands'. Montenegro further increased its size several times by the 20th century, as the result of wars against the Ottoman Empire, which saw the annexation of Old Herzegovina and parts of Metohija and southern Raška. Its borders have changed little since then, losing Metohija and gaining the Bay of Kotor.

After the second session of the AVNOJ during World War II in Yugoslavia, the contemporary modern state of Montenegro was founded as the Federal State of Montenegro (Montenegrin: Савезна држава Црне Горе / Savezna država Crne Gore) on 15 November 1943 within the Yugoslav Federation by the ZAVNOCGB. After the war, Montenegro became a republic under its name, the People's Republic of Montenegro (Montenegrin: Народна Република Црна Гора / Narodna Republika Crna Gora) on 29 November 1945. In 1963, it was renamed to the Socialist Republic of Montenegro  (Montenegrin: Социјалистичка Република Црна Гора / Socijalistička Republika Crna Gora). As the breakup of Yugoslavia occurred, the SRCG was renamed to the Republic of Montenegro (Montenegrin: Република Црна Гора / Republika Crna Gora) on 27 April 1992 within the Federal Republic of Yugoslavia by removing the adjective "socialist" from the republic's title. Since 22 October 2007, a year after its independence, the name of the country became simply known as Montenegro.

History

Antiquity

Modern-day Montenegro was part of Illyria and populated by the Indo-European-speaking Illyrians. The Illyrian kingdom was conquered by the Roman Republic in the Illyro-Roman Wars and the region was incorporated into the province of Illyricum (later Dalmatia and Praevalitana).

Arrival of the Slavs 

Three Serbian principalities were located on the territory: Duklja, roughly corresponding to the southern half, Travunia, the west, and Raška, the north. Duklja gained its independence from the Byzantine Roman Empire in 1042. Over the next few decades, it expanded its territory to neighbouring Rascia and Bosnia, and also became recognised as a kingdom. Its power started declining at the beginning of the 12th century. After King Bodin's death (in 1101 or 1108), civil wars ensued. Duklja reached its zenith under Vojislav's son, Mihailo (1046–1081), and his grandson Constantine Bodin (1081–1101).

As the nobility fought for the throne, the kingdom was weakened, and by 1186, the territory of modern-day Montenegro became part of the state ruled by Stefan Nemanja and was a part of various state formations ruled by the Nemanjić dynasty for the next two centuries. After the Serbian Empire collapsed in the second half of the 14th century, the most powerful Zetan family, the Balšićs, became sovereigns of Zeta.

By the 13th century, Zeta had replaced Duklja when referring to the realm. In the late 14th century, southern Montenegro (Zeta) came under the rule of the Balšić noble family, then the Crnojević noble family, and by the 15th century, Zeta was more often referred to as Crna Gora.

In 1421, Zeta was annexed to the Serbian Despotate, but after 1455, another noble family from Zeta, the Crnojevićs, became sovereign rulers of the country, making it the last free monarchy of the Balkans before it fell to the Ottomans in 1496, and got annexed to the sanjak of Shkodër. For a short time, Montenegro existed as a separate autonomous sanjak in 1514–1528 (Sanjak of Montenegro). Also, Old Herzegovina region was part of Sanjak of Herzegovina.

Early modern period 

From 1392, numerous parts of the territory were controlled by Republic of Venice, including the city of Budva, in that time known as "Budua". 
The Venetian territory was centred on the Bay of Kotor, and the Republic introduced governors who meddled in Montenegrin politics. Venice controlled territories in present-day Montenegro until its fall in 1797.
Large portions fell under the control of the Ottoman Empire from 1496 to 1878. In the 16th century, Montenegro developed a unique form of autonomy within the Ottoman Empire that permitted Montenegrin clans freedom from certain restrictions. Nevertheless, the Montenegrins were disgruntled with Ottoman rule, and in the 17th century, repeatedly rebelled, which culminated in the defeat of the Ottomans in the Great Turkish War at the end of that century.

Montenegrin territories were controlled by warlike clans. Most clans had a chieftain (knez), who was not permitted to assume the title unless he proved to be as worthy a leader as his predecessor. An assembly of Montenegrin clans (Zbor) was held every year on 12 July in Cetinje, and any adult clansman could take part. In 1515, Montenegro became a theocracy led by the Metropolitanate of Montenegro and the Littoral, which flourished after the Petrović-Njegoš of Cetinje became the traditional prince-bishops (whose title was "Vladika of Montenegro").

People from Montenegro in this historical period were described as Orthodox Serbs.

Principality and Kingdom of Montenegro 

In 1858, one of the major Montenegrin victories over the Ottomans occurred at the Battle of Grahovac. Grand Duke Mirko Petrović, elder brother of Knjaz Danilo, led an army of 7,500 and defeated the numerically superior Ottomans with 15,000 troops at Grahovac on 1 May 1858. This forced the Great Powers to officially demarcate the borders between Montenegro and Ottoman Empire, de facto recognizing Montenegro's independence.

In the Battle of Vučji Do Montenegrins inflicted a major defeat on the Ottoman Army under Grand Vizier Ahmed Muhtar Pasha. In the aftermath of the Russian victory against the Ottoman Empire in the Russo-Turkish War of 1877–1878, the major powers restructured the map of the Balkan region. The Ottoman Empire recognised the independence of Montenegro in the Treaty of Berlin in 1878.

The first Montenegrin constitution (also known as the Danilo Code) was proclaimed in 1855. Under Nicholas I (ruled 1860–1918), the principality was enlarged several times in the Montenegro-Turkish Wars and was recognised as independent in 1878. Nicholas I established diplomatic relations with the Ottoman Empire. Minor border skirmishes excepted, diplomacy ushered in about 30 years of peace between the two states until the deposition of Abdul Hamid II in 1909.

The political skills of Abdul Hamid II and Nicholas I played a major role in the mutually amicable relations. Modernization of the state followed, culminating with the draft of a Constitution in 1905. However, political rifts emerged between the reigning People's Party, who supported the process of democratisation and union with Serbia, and those of the True People's Party, who were monarchist.

In 1910, Montenegro became a kingdom, and as a result of the Balkan Wars of 1912–1913, a common border with Serbia was established, with Shkodër being awarded to Albania, though the current capital city of Montenegro, Podgorica, was on the old border of Albania and Yugoslavia. Montenegro became one of the Allied Powers during World War I (1914–18). In the Battle of Mojkovac fought in January 1916 between Austria-Hungary and the Kingdom of Montenegro, Montenegrins achieved a decisive victory even though they were outnumbered five to one. The Austro-Hungarians accepted military surrender on 25 January 1916. From 1916 to October 1918 Austria-Hungary occupied Montenegro. During the occupation, King Nicholas fled the country and established a government-in-exile in Bordeaux.

Kingdom of Yugoslavia 

In 1922, Montenegro formally became the Oblast of Cetinje in the Kingdom of Serbs, Croats and Slovenes, with the addition of the coastal areas around Budva and Bay of Kotor. In a further restructuring in 1929, it became a part of a larger Zeta Banate of the Kingdom of Yugoslavia that reached the Neretva River.

Nicholas's grandson, the Serb King Alexander I, dominated the Yugoslav government. Zeta Banovina was one of nine banovinas that formed the kingdom; it consisted of the present-day Montenegro and parts of Serbia, Croatia, and Bosnia.

World War II and Socialist Yugoslavia 

In April 1941, Nazi Germany, the Kingdom of Italy, and other Axis allies attacked and occupied the Kingdom of Yugoslavia. Italian forces occupied Montenegro and established a puppet Kingdom of Montenegro.

In May, the Montenegrin branch of the Communist Party of Yugoslavia started preparations for an uprising planned for mid-July. The Communist Party and its Youth League organised 6,000 of its members into detachments prepared for guerrilla warfare. According to some historians, the first armed uprising in Nazi-occupied Europe happened on 13 July 1941 in Montenegro.

Unexpectedly, the uprising took hold, and by 20 July, 32,000 men and women had joined the fight. Except for the coast and major towns (Podgorica, Cetinje, Pljevlja, and Nikšić), which were besieged, Montenegro was mostly liberated. In a month of fighting, the Italian army suffered 5,000 dead, wounded, and captured. The uprising lasted until mid-August, when it was suppressed by a counter-offensive of 67,000 Italian troops brought in from Albania. Faced with new and overwhelming Italian forces, many of the fighters laid down their arms and returned home. Nevertheless, intense guerrilla fighting lasted until December.

Fighters who remained under arms fractured into two groups. Most of them went on to join the Yugoslav Partisans, consisting of communists and those inclined towards active resistance; these included Arso Jovanović, Sava Kovačević, Svetozar Vukmanović-Tempo, Milovan Đilas, Peko Dapčević, Vlado Dapčević, Veljko Vlahović, and Blažo Jovanović. Those loyal to the Karađorđević dynasty and opposing communism went on to become Chetniks, and turned to collaboration with Italians against the Partisans.

War broke out between Partisans and Chetniks during the first half of 1942. Pressured by Italians and Chetniks, the core of the Montenegrin Partisans went to Serbia and Bosnia, where they joined with other Yugoslav Partisans. Fighting between Partisans and Chetniks continued through the war. Chetniks with Italian backing controlled most of the country from mid-1942 to April 1943. Montenegrin Chetniks received the status of "anti-communist militia" and received weapons, ammunition, food rations, and money from Italy. Most of them were moved to Mostar, where they fought in the Battle of Neretva against the Partisans, but were dealt a heavy defeat.

During German operation Schwartz against the Partisans in May and June 1943, Germans disarmed many Chetniks without fighting, as they feared they would turn against them in case of an Allied invasion of the Balkans. After the capitulation of Italy in September 1943, Partisans managed to take hold of most of Montenegro for a brief time, but Montenegro was soon occupied by German forces, and fierce fighting continued during late 1943 and 1944. Montenegro was liberated by the Partisans in December 1944.

Montenegro became one of the six constituent republics of the communist Socialist Federal Republic of Yugoslavia (SFRY). Its capital became Podgorica, renamed Titograd in honour of President Josip Broz Tito. After the war, the infrastructure of Yugoslavia was rebuilt, industrialization began, and the University of Montenegro was established. Greater autonomy was established until the Socialist Republic of Montenegro ratified a new constitution in 1974.

Montenegro within FR Yugoslavia 

After the dissolution of the SFRY in 1992, Montenegro remained part of a smaller Federal Republic of Yugoslavia along with Serbia. In the referendum on remaining in Yugoslavia in 1992, the turnout was 66%, with 96% of the votes cast in favour of the federation with Serbia. The referendum was boycotted by the Muslim, Albanian, and Catholic minorities, as well as pro-independence Montenegrins. The opponents claimed that the poll was organised under anti-democratic conditions with widespread propaganda from the state-controlled media in favour of a pro-federation vote. No impartial report on the fairness of the referendum was made, as it was unmonitored, unlike in a later 2006 referendum when European Union observers were present.

During the 1991–1995 Bosnian War and Croatian War, Montenegrin police and military forces joined Serbian troops in attacks on Dubrovnik, Croatia. These operations, aimed at acquiring more territory, were characterised by large-scale violations of human rights.

Montenegrin General Pavle Strugar was convicted for his part in the bombing of Dubrovnik. Bosnian refugees were arrested by Montenegrin police and transported to Serb camps in Foča, where they were subjected to systematic torture and executed.

In 1996, Milo Đukanović's government severed ties between Montenegro and its partner Serbia, which was led by Slobodan Milošević. Montenegro formed its own economic policy and adopted the German Deutsche Mark as its currency and subsequently adopted the euro, although not part of the Eurozone. Subsequent governments pursued pro-independence policies, and political tensions with Serbia simmered despite political changes in Belgrade.

Targets in Montenegro were bombed by NATO forces during Operation Allied Force in 1999, although the extent of these attacks was limited in both time and area affected.

In 2002, Serbia and Montenegro came to a new agreement for continued cooperation and entered into negotiations regarding the future status of the Federal Republic of Yugoslavia. This resulted in the Belgrade Agreement, which saw the country's transformation into a more decentralised state union named Serbia and Montenegro in 2003. The Belgrade Agreement also contained a provision delaying any future referendum on the independence of Montenegro for at least three years.

Independence 

The status of the union between Montenegro and Serbia was decided by a referendum on Montenegrin independence on 21 May 2006. A total of 419,240 votes were cast, representing 86.5% of the electorate; 230,661 votes (55.5%) were for independence and 185,002 votes (44.5%) were against. This narrowly surpassed the 55% threshold needed to validate the referendum under the rules set by the European Union. According to the electoral commission, the 55% threshold was passed by only 2,300 votes. Serbia, the member-states of the European Union, and the permanent members of the United Nations Security Council all recognised Montenegro's independence.

The 2006 referendum was monitored by five international observer missions, headed by an OSCE/ODIHR team, and around 3,000 observers in total (including domestic observers from CDT (OSCE PA), the Parliamentary Assembly of the Council of Europe (PACE), the Congress of Local and Regional Authorities of the Council of Europe (CLRAE), and the European Parliament (EP) to form an International Referendum Observation Mission (IROM). The IROM—in its preliminary report—"assessed compliance of the referendum process with OSCE commitments, Council of Europe commitments, other international standards for democratic electoral processes, and domestic legislation." Furthermore, the report stated that the competitive pre-referendum environment was marked by an active and generally peaceful campaign and that "there were no reports of restrictions on fundamental civil and political rights."

On 3 June 2006, the Montenegrin Parliament declared the independence of Montenegro, formally confirming the result of the referendum.

On 28 June 2006, Montenegro joined the United Nations as its 192nd member state.

The Law on the Status of the Descendants of the Petrović Njegoš Dynasty was passed by the Parliament of Montenegro on 12 July 2011. It rehabilitated the Royal House of Montenegro and recognised limited symbolic roles within the constitutional framework of the republic.

In 2015, the investigative journalists' network OCCRP named Montenegro's long-time President and Prime Minister Milo Đukanović "Person of the Year in Organized Crime". The extent of Đukanović's corruption led to street demonstrations and calls for his removal.

In October 2016, for the day of the parliamentary election, a coup d'état was prepared by a group of persons that included leaders of the Montenegrin opposition, Serbian nationals and Russian agents; the coup was prevented. In 2017, fourteen people, including two Russian nationals and two Montenegrin opposition leaders, Andrija Mandić and Milan Knežević, were indicted for their alleged roles in the coup attempt on charges such as "preparing a conspiracy against the constitutional order and the security of Montenegro" and an "attempted terrorist act."

Recent history 

Montenegro formally became a member of NATO in June 2017, though "Montenegro remains deeply divided over joining NATO", an event that triggered a promise of retaliatory actions from Russia's government.

Montenegro has been in negotiations with the EU since 2012. In 2018, the earlier goal of acceding by 2022 was revised to 2025.

In April 2018, Milo Djukanovic, the leader of the ruling Democratic Party of Socialists (DPS), won Montenegro's presidential election. The veteran politician had served as Prime Minister six times and as president once before. He had dominated Montenegrin politics since 1991.

Anti-corruption protests began in February 2019 against Đukanović and the Prime Minister Duško Marković-led government of the ruling Democratic Party of Socialists (DPS), which had been in power since 1991.

As of late December 2019, the newly adopted Law on Religion, which de jure transferred the ownership of church buildings and estates built before 1918 from the Serbian Orthodox Church to the Montenegrin state, sparked large protests and road blockages. Seventeen opposition Democratic Front MPs were arrested prior to the voting for disrupting the vote. Demonstrations continued into March 2020 as peaceful protest walks, mostly organised by the Metropolitanate of Montenegro and the Littoral and the Eparchy of Budimlja and Nikšić in the majority of Montenegrin municipalities.

In its political rights and civil liberties worldwide report in May 2020, Freedom House marked Montenegro as a hybrid regime rather than a democracy because of declining standards in governance, justice, elections, and media freedom. For the first time in three decades, in the 2020 parliamentary election, the opposition won more votes than Đukanović's ruling party. In February 2022, that very same government was voted out in the first successful vote of no-confidence in the country's history.

On 11 August 2022, a mass shooting occurred in the city of Cetinje. Eleven people, including the perpetrator, were killed, and six others were injured. It is the deadliest mass shooting in Montenegro's history.

Geography 

The plain stops abruptly in the north, where Mount Lovćen and Mount Orjen plunge into the inlet of the Bay of Kotor.

Owing to the hyperhumid climate on their western sides, the Montenegrin mountain ranges were among the most ice-eroded parts of the Balkan Peninsula during the last glacial period.

Internationally, Montenegro borders Serbia, Bosnia and Herzegovina, Kosovo, Albania and Croatia. It lies between latitudes 41° and 44°N, and longitudes 18° and 21°E.

Biodiversity 

The diversity of the geological base, landscape, climate, and soil, and the position of Montenegro on the Balkan Peninsula and Adriatic Sea, created the conditions for high biological diversity, putting Montenegro among the "hot-spots" of European and world biodiversity. The number of species per area unit index in Montenegro is 0.837, the highest in any European country.

Biological estimates suggest that over 1,200 species of freshwater algae, 300 species of marine algae, 589 species of moss, 7,000-8,000 species of vascular plants, 2,000 species of fungi, 16,000-20,000 species of insects, 407 species of marine fish, 56 species of reptile, 333 species of regularly visiting birds and a high species diversity of mammals are found in Montenegro.

Montenegro can be divided into two main biogeographic regions, which include the Mediterranean Biogeographic Region and the Alpine Biogeographic Region. It is also home to three terrestrial ecoregions: Balkan mixed forests, Dinaric Mountains mixed forests, and Illyrian deciduous forests. It had a 2019 Forest Landscape Integrity Index mean score of 6.41/10, ranking it 73rd globally out of 172 countries.

The total share of protected areas in Montenegro is 9.05% of the country's area, which mainly comes from the five national parks of Montenegro.

Government and politics 

The Constitution of Montenegro describes the state as a "civic, democratic, ecological state of social justice, based on the reign of Law". Montenegro is an independent and sovereign republic that established its constitution on 22 October 2007. The President of Montenegro is the head of state, elected for a period of five years through direct elections. The President represents the country abroad, promulgates laws by ordinance, calls elections for the Parliament, and proposes candidates for Prime Minister, president and justices of the Constitutional Court to the Parliament. The President also proposes the calling of a referendum to Parliament, grants amnesty for criminal offences prescribed by the national law, confers decoration and awards and performs other constitutional duties and is a member of the Supreme Defence Council. The official residence of the President is in Cetinje.

The Government of Montenegro is the executive branch of government authority of Montenegro. The government is headed by the Prime Minister and consists of deputy prime ministers and ministers.

The Parliament of Montenegro is a unicameral legislative body. It passes laws, ratifies treaties, appoints the Prime Minister, ministers, and justices of all courts, adopts the budget and performs other duties as established by the Constitution. Parliament can pass a vote of no-confidence in the Government by a simple majority. One representative is elected per 6,000 voters.

In 2019, Freedom House reported that years of increasing state capture, abuse of power, and strongman tactics employed by President Đukanović led the country for the first time since 2003, Montenegro to be categorised as a hybrid regime instead of a democracy. Djukanovic's pro-Western Democratic Party of Socialists (DPS) narrowly lost the 2020 Montenegrin parliamentary election, ending its 30-year rule. The opposition "For the Future of Montenegro" (ZBCG) bloc is composed mainly of Serb nationalist parties. The new pro-Serbian government was formed by Prime Minister Zdravko Krivokapic. However, Prime Minister Zdravko Krivokapic's government was toppled in a no-confidence vote after 14 months in power. In April 2022, a new minority government, composed of moderate parties that are both pro-European and pro-Serb, was formed. The new government was led by Prime Minister Dritan Abazovic.

Foreign relations 

The Ministry of Foreign Affairs was given the task of defining the foreign policy priorities and activities needed for their implementation in cooperation with other state administration authorities, the President, the Speaker of the Parliament, and other relevant stakeholders.

Integration into the European Union is Montenegro's strategic goal. This process will remain the focus of Montenegrin foreign policy in the short term. The second goal was to join NATO, achieved on 5 June 2017.

Military 

The military of Montenegro is a professional standing army under the Ministry of Defence. It is composed of the Montenegrin Ground Army, the Montenegrin Navy, and the Montenegrin Air Force, along with special forces. Conscription was abolished in 2006. The military maintains an active duty force of 2,400. The bulk of its equipment and forces were inherited from the armed forces of the State Union of Serbia and Montenegro. Montenegro contained the entire coastline of the former union and retained practically the entire naval force.
	
Montenegro is a NATO member and a member of Adriatic Charter. The government planned to have the army participate in peacekeeping missions through the UN and NATO such as the International Security Assistance Force.

Symbols 

The flag includes a border and arms in gold and a golden lion in the center.

The national day of 13 July marks the date in 1878 when the Congress of Berlin recognised Montenegro as the 27th independent state in the world and the start of one of the first popular uprisings in Europe against the Axis Powers on 13 July 1941 in Montenegro.

In 2004, the Montenegrin legislature selected a popular Montenegrin traditional song, "Oh, Bright Dawn of May", as the national anthem. Montenegro's official anthem during the reign of King Nicholas I was Ubavoj nam Crnoj Gori ("To Our Beautiful Montenegro").

Administrative divisions 

Montenegro is divided into twenty-four municipalities (opština). This includes 21 District-level Municipalities and 2 Urban Municipalities, with two subdivisions of Podgorica municipality, listed below.  Each municipality can contain multiple cities and towns.  Historically, the territory of the country was divided into "nahije".

Regions of Montenegro—designed for statistical purposes by the Statistical Office—have no administrative function. Note that other organization (i.e. Football Association of Montenegro) use different municipalities as a part of similar regions.

Municipalities of Montenegro

Northern Region

Central Region

Coastal Region

Economy 

The economy of Montenegro is mostly service-based and is in late transition to a market economy. According to the International Monetary Fund, the nominal GDP of Montenegro was $5.424 billion in 2019. The GDP PPP for 2019 was $12.516 billion, or $20,083 per capita. According to Eurostat data, the Montenegrin GDP per capita stood at 48% of the EU average in 2018. The Central Bank of Montenegro is not part of the euro system but the country is "euroised", using the euro unilaterally as its currency.

GDP grew at 10.7% in 2007 and 7.5% in 2008. The country entered a recession in 2008 as a part of the global recession. GDP contracted by 4%. However, Montenegro remained a target for foreign investment, the only country in the Balkans to increase its amount of direct foreign investment in 2008. The country exited recession in mid-2010, with GDP growth at around 0.5%. However, the significant dependence of the Montenegrin economy on foreign direct investment leaves it susceptible to external shocks and a high trade deficit.

In 2007, the service sector made up 72.4% of GDP, with industry and agriculture making up the rest at 17.6% and 10%, respectively. 50,000 farming households in Montenegro rely on agriculture.

Infrastructure 

The Montenegrin road infrastructure is not at Western European standards. No roads meet full motorway standards. Construction of new motorways is considered a national priority, as they are important for uniform economic development and the development of Montenegro as an attractive tourist destination.

The European routes that pass through Montenegro are E65 and E80.

The backbone of the Montenegrin rail network is the Belgrade–Bar railway, which provides international connection towards Serbia. A domestic branch line, the Nikšić-Podgorica railway operated as a freight-only line for decades, that opened for passenger traffic after reconstruction and electrification in 2012. The other branch line from Podgorica towards the Albanian border, the Podgorica–Shkodër railway, is not in use.

Montenegro has two international airports, Podgorica Airport and Tivat Airport.

The Port of Bar is Montenegro's main seaport. Initially built in 1906, the port was almost completely destroyed during World War II Reconstruction began in 1950. It is equipped to handle over 5 million tons of cargo annually, but has been operating at a loss and well below capacity. The reconstruction of the Belgrade-Bar railway and the proposed Belgrade-Bar motorway are expected to return operating levels to capacity.

Tourism 

With a total of 1.6 million visitors, Montenegro was, as of 2017, the 36th-most-visited country (out of 47) in Europe. The majority of foreign visitors to Montenegro come from the neighbouring countries of Serbia, Bosnia and Herzegovina and Kosovo, as well as Russia. Some of the most popular beaches include Jaz Beach, Mogren Beach, Bečići Beach, Sveti Stefan Beach and Velika Plaža. Meanwhile, some of the most popular ancient towns include Herceg Novi, Perast, Kotor, Budva and Ulcinj.

National Geographic Traveler (edited once a decade) ranks Montenegro among the "50 Places of a Lifetime". Montenegrin seaside town Sveti Stefan was once used as the cover for the magazine. The coast region of Montenegro was considered one of the great "discoveries" among world tourists. In January 2010, The New York Times ranked the Ulcinj South Coast region of Montenegro, including Velika Plaža, Ada Bojana, and the Hotel Mediteran of Ulcinj, among the "Top 31 Places to Go in 2010" as part of a worldwide ranking.

Montenegro was listed by Yahoo Travel among the "10 Top Hot Spots of 2009" to visit, describing it as "the second fastest growing tourism market in the world (falling just behind China)". It is listed by tourism guides like Lonely Planet as a top destination.

Demographics

Ethnic structure 

The 2011 census reported 620,029 citizens. According to the U.S. Census Bureau, in 2015, 9,486 ethnic Serbs there were born in "Other Eastern Europe" countries, overwhelmingly Montenegro. According to the 2000 U.S. census, 2,339 individuals claimed first ancestry in Montenegro, and 189 whose second ancestry was Montenegrin, totaling 2,528 overall.

Montenegro is a multiethnic state with no ethnic majority. Major ethnic groups include Montenegrins (Црногорци/Crnogorci) and Serbs (Срби/Srbi); others are Bosniaks (Bošnjaci), Muslims (ethnic group) (Muslimani), Albanians (Albanci – Shqiptarët) and Croats (Hrvati). The number of "Montenegrins" and "Serbs" fluctuates widely from census to census due to changes in how people perceive, experience, or choose to express, their identity and ethnic affiliation.

Languages 

The official language in Montenegro is Montenegrin. Serbian, Bosnian, Albanian, and Croatian are recognised in usage. Montenegrin, Serbian, Bosnian, and Croatian are mutually intelligible as standard varieties of the Serbo-Croatian language. Montenegrin is the plurality mother-tongue of the under-18 population. Previous constitutions endorsed Serbo-Croatian as the official language in SR Montenegro and Serbian of the Ijekavian standard during the 1992–2006 period.

Religion 

Montenegro has historically stood at the crossroads of multiculturalism and over centuries this has shaped its unique co-existence between Muslim and Christian populations. Montenegrins have historically been members of the Serbian Orthodox Church (governed by the Metropolitanate of Montenegro and the Littoral). Serbian Orthodox Christianity is the most popular religion. The Montenegrin Orthodox Church was recently founded and is followed by a minority of Montenegrins, although it is not in communion with any other Christian Orthodox Church as it has not been officially recognised.

Despite tensions between religious groups during the Bosnian War, Montenegro remained fairly stable, mainly due to its population's perspective on religious tolerance and faith diversity. Religious institutions have guaranteed rights and are separate from the state. The second largest religion is Islam, practiced by 19% of the population. Montenegro has the sixth-highest proportion of Muslims in Europe, after Kosovo (96%), Turkey (90%-99%), Albania (58.9%), Bosnia and Herzegovina (51%), and North Macedonia (34%), and the third highest proportion among Slavic countries, behind only Bosnia and Herzegovina and North Macedonia. A little more than one-fourth of the country's Albanians are Catholics (8,126 in the 2004 census) while the rest (22,267) are mainly Sunni Muslims; in 2012 a protocol recognised Islam as an official religion, which ensures that halal foods are served at military facilities, hospitals, dormitories and social facilities; and that Muslim women are permitted to wear headscarves in schools and at public institutions, as well as ensuring that Muslims have the right to take Fridays off for the Jumu'ah (Friday)-prayer. Since the time of Vojislavljević dynasty Catholicism is autochthonous in the Montenegrin area. A small Roman Catholic population, mostly Albanians with some Croats, is divided between the Archdiocese of Antivari headed by the Primate of Serbia and the Diocese of Kotor that is a part of the Catholic Church in Croatia.

Culture 

Montenegrin culture has been shaped most importantly by Orthodox, Ottoman (Turk), Slavic, Central European, and seafaring Adriatic cultures (notably parts of Italy, like the Republic of Venice).

Montenegro has many significant cultural and historical sites, including heritage sites from the pre-Romanesque, Gothic and Baroque periods. The Montenegrin coastal region is known for its religious monuments, including the Cathedral of Saint Tryphon in Kotor (Cattaro under the Venetians), the basilica of St. Luke (over 800 years), Our Lady of the Rocks (Škrpjela), the Savina Monastery and others. Medieval monasteries contain many artistically important frescoes.

One cultural dimension is the ethical ideal of Čojstvo i Junaštvo, "Humaneness and Gallantry". The traditional folk dance of the Montenegrins is the Oro, the "eagle dance" that involves dancing in circles with couples alternating in the centre, and is finished by forming a human pyramid of dancers standing on each other's shoulders.

Media 

Television, magazines, and newspapers are operated by both state-owned and for-profit corporations that depend on advertising, subscription, and other sales-related revenues. The Constitution of Montenegro guarantees freedom of speech. Montenegro's media system is under transformation, along with the rest of the country.

Sport 

Sport in Montenegro revolves mostly around team sports, such as water polo, football, basketball, handball, and volleyball. Other sports involved are boxing, tennis, swimming, judo, karate, athletics, table tennis, and chess.

Water polo is the most popular and is considered the national sport. Montenegro men's national water polo team is one of the world's top ranked teams, winning the gold medal at the 2008 Men's European Water Polo Championship in Málaga, Spain, and winning the gold medal at the 2009 FINA Men's Water Polo World League, held in Podgorica. The Montenegrin team PVK Primorac from Kotor became a champion of Europe at the LEN Euroleague 2009 in Rijeka, Croatia.

Football is the second most popular sport. Notable players are Dejan Savićević, Predrag Mijatović, Mirko Vučinić, Stefan Savić, Stevan Jovetić, and Stefan Mugoša. The Montenegrin national football team, founded in 2006, played in playoffs for UEFA Euro 2012, its biggest success. The Montenegro national basketball team is known for good performances and won a lot of medals as part of the Yugoslavia national basketball team. In 2006, the Basketball Federation of Montenegro along with this team joined the International Basketball Federation (FIBA) on its own, following the Independence. Montenegro participated in two EuroBaskets.

Among women sports, the national handball team is the most successful, having won the 2012 European Championship and finishing as runners-up at the 2012 Summer Olympics. ŽRK Budućnost Podgorica twice won EHF Champions League.

Chess is another popular sport and notable global chess players such as Slavko Dedić were born there.

At the 2012 Olympic Games in London, the Montenegro women's national handball team won the country's first Olympic medal, claiming silver. They lost in the final to defending world, Olympic, and European champion Norway 26–23. Following this defeat the team won against Norway in the final of the 2012 European Championship, becoming champions for the first time.

National Cuisine 

The first major influences to Montenegrin cuisine came from the Levant and Turkey: sarma, musaka, pilav, pita, gibanica, burek, ćevapi, kebab, đuveč, and Turkish sweets such as baklava and tulumba.

Hungarian cuisine influences stews and sataraš. Central European cuisine is evident in the prevalence of crêpes, doughnuts, jams, many types of biscuits and cakes, and various kinds of breads.

Montenegrin cuisine also varies geographically; the cuisine in the coastal area differs from that of the northern highland region. The coastal area is traditionally a representative of Mediterranean cuisine, with seafood being a common dish. The traditional dishes of Montenegro's Adriatic coast, unlike its heartland, have a distinctively Italian influence as well.

See also 
 Montenegro real estate taxes
 Outline of Montenegro

Notes

Bibliography 
Notes

References 
 - Total pages: 561

Sources

Further reading 

 Banac, Ivo.  The National Question in Yugoslavia: Origins, History, Politics Cornell University Press, (1984) 
 Fleming, Thomas. Montenegro: The Divided Land (2002) 
 Longley, Norm. The Rough Guide to Montenegro (2009) 
 Morrison, Kenneth. Montenegro: A Modern History (2009) 
 Roberts, Elizabeth. Realm of the Black Mountain: A History of Montenegro (Cornell University Press, 2007) 521pp 
 Stevenson, Francis Seymour. A History of Montenegro 2002) 
 Özcan, Uğur II. Abdulhamid Dönemi Osmanlı-Karadağ Siyasi İlişkileri [Political relations between the Ottoman Empire and Montenegro in the Abdul Hamid II era] (2013) Türk Tarih Kurumu Turkish Historical Society

External links 

 Official website of the Government of Montenegro (English)
 Montenegro in The World Factbook of the Central Intelligence Agency
 Montenegro from UCB Libraries GovPubs
 
 Montenegro profile from the BBC News
 Culture Corner – leading Montenegrin web portal for culture
 Official website National Parks Montenegro
 
 

 

Balkan countries
Countries in Europe
Member states of NATO
Member states of the Council of Europe
Member states of the Union for the Mediterranean
Member states of the United Nations
Serbian-speaking countries and territories
Southeastern European countries
Southern European countries
States and territories established in 2006